1854 in archaeology

Explorations
 Giovanni Battista de Rossi discovers the Catacomb of Callixtus in Rome.
 Karl von Scherzer examines and writes a description of Quiriguá, a Maya site in Guatemala.
 Thomas Wright investigates Kit's Coty House, the remains of a Neolithic chambered long barrow in Kent, England.

Excavations

Publications

Finds
 Coleraine Hoard in the north of Ireland.
 Dalton Parlours Roman villa in Yorkshire, England.

Awards

Miscellaneous

Births
 August 26 - Kate Bradbury Griffith, English Egyptologist (d. 1902)

Deaths
 September 27 - Frederick Catherwood (b. 1799)

See also 
 List of years in archaeology
 1853 in archaeology
 1855 in archaeology

Archaeology
Archaeology by year
Archaeology
Archaeology